Västmanland County or Region Västmanland held a regional council election on 9 September 2018, on the same day as the general and municipal elections.

Results
The number of seats remained at 77 with the Social Democrats winning the most at 27, a drop of three from 2014. Among the traditional national blocs, the leftist parties received 44.0% and the centre-right parties 40.2%. Since the Green Party did not receive enough votes to gain seats, the seat share was the much closer 33–32.

Municipalities

Images

References

Elections in Västmanland County
Västmanland